Güriin Ragchaa (December 1946 – 2009) was a Mongolian major general. He was a key figure in the creation of the Mongolian international peace keeping forces.

Footnotes

1946 births
2009 deaths
Mongolian military personnel